1998 ACC tournament may refer to:

 1998 ACC men's basketball tournament
 1998 ACC women's basketball tournament
 1998 ACC men's soccer tournament
 1998 ACC women's soccer tournament
 1998 Atlantic Coast Conference baseball tournament
 1998 Atlantic Coast Conference softball tournament